France 3 Aquitaine is one of France 3's regional services broadcasting to people in the Nouvelle-Aquitaine region. It was founded in 1962.The service is headquartered in Bordeaux, the city of the region. The channel is available in French, Basque, and Occitan audio tracks. France 3 Aquitaine also produces content.

Presenters
 Sandrine Papin
 Eric Perrin
 Frédérique Lillet
 Vincent Dubroca
 Thierry Blancot
 Denis Salles
 Serge Guynier
 Totte Darguy
 Marie-Pierre D'abrigeon
 Fabrice Goll
 Nicolas Morin
 Pascal Cagnato

Programming
 Côté cuisine
 J'aime beaucoup ce que vous faites
 Le mag' du Pays Basque
 Sport Aq
 Punt de vista
 La voix est libre
 Samedi le matin

See also
 France 3

References

External links 
 Official France 3 Aquitaine website—

03 Aquitaine
Mass media in Bordeaux
Aquitaine
Nouvelle-Aquitaine
Television channels and stations established in 1962
1962 establishments in France